Justice Carney may refer to:

Paul Carney (1943–2015), justice of the High Court of Ireland
Susan M. Carney (born 1962), justice of the Supreme Court of Alaska

See also
Judge Carney (disambiguation)